Hutchinson County is a county in the U.S. state of Texas. As of the 2020 census, its population was 20,617. Its county seat is Stinnett. The county was created in 1876, but not organized until 1901. It is named for Andrew Hutchinson, an early Texas attorney.

Hutchinson County comprises the Borger, TX Micropolitan Statistical Area, which is also included in the Amarillo-Borger, TX Combined Statistical Area. The history of Hutchinson County is accented in downtown Borger in the Hutchinson County Historical Museum, also known as Boomtown Revisited. Hutchinson County is the county with the most ghost towns in the Texas Panhandle.

History

Native Americans
Artifacts of the Antelope Creek Indian culture abound along the Canadian River valley in Hutchinson County. Archaeologists have found  of Alibates flint in the area that was used as a quarry for shaping flint tools.  Nomadic Plains Apache also camped in this area, as did Comanche, Arapaho, Kiowa, and Cheyenne.

Bent, St. Vrain and Company established a trading post in this area to tap into Indian trading.  Known as Fort Adobe, it was blown up by traders three years later due to Indian depredations.  The ruins became known as Adobe Walls.

The First Battle of Adobe Walls took place in 1864 when General James H. Carleton sent Colonel Kit Carson into the area to avenge for repeated Indian attacks. Carson and several hundred cavalry soldiers were greatly outnumbered by Kiowa and Comanche and forced to retreat. The Second Battle of Adobe Walls took place in 1874. A group of buffalo hunters attempted a revitalization of Fort Adobe.  The Comanches, Cheyenne, Arapaho, and Kiowa saw the fort and the decimation of the buffalo herd as a threat to their existence. Comanche medicine man Isa-tai prophesied a victory and immunity to the white man's bullets in battle.  Quanah Parker lead several hundred in a raid on the fort.  The buffalo hunters were able to force the Indians into retreat.

Early explorations

In 1541, an expedition led by Francisco Vásquez de Coronado traversed the area on its Great Plains quest for Quivira on the search for the mythical Seven Cities of Gold. Spanish conquistador Juan de Oñate passed through in 1601 on his Kansas expedition. Buffalo hunters and Comanchero from New Mexico hunted and traded in the vicinity until the 1870s. The first Anglo-American expedition to come through the county was led by Stephen H. Long, who mistook the Canadian River for the Red River, in August 1820. Josiah Gregg brought his Santa Fe caravan through in March 1840. During the month of December 1858, Lt. Edward Beale with 100 men passed through the county constructing a federally funded military road, the first to be constructed in the American Southwest. The road went from Fort Smith, Arkansas, to Los Angeles. It was named the Beale Wagon Road by Secretary of War John B. Floyd.

Early ranch entrepreneurs

In November 1876, Kansan Thomas Sherman Bugbee established the Quarter Circle T Ranch. The Scissors Ranch was begun in 1878 by William E. Anderson at the Adobe Walls site. The ranch was named after the brand, which looked like a pair of scissors. Coloradan Richard E. McNalty moved to Texas and began the Turkey Track Ranch, which he sold to Charles Wood and Jack Snider in 1881. Scotland-born James M. Coburn formed the Hansford Land and Cattle Company. The Quarter Circle T Ranch and Scissors Ranch were sold to Coburn in 1882. Coburn acquired the Turkey Track Ranch in 1883.

County established

Hutchinson County was established in 1876. The county was not organized until 1901, when Plemons became the county seat. For the next four decades, ranching dominated the county's economy, while crop cultivation made gradual headway.

The Panhandle oilfield was discovered in the 1920s. Towns sprang up in response. The population mushroomed from 721 in 1920 to 14,848 in 1930 as a result of the oil boom. By 1990,  of oil had been taken from Hutchinson County lands since 1923.

Stinnett became the county seat after a special election on September 18, 1926.

Geography

Major highways
  State Highway 136
  State Highway 152
  State Highway 207

Adjacent counties

 Hansford County (north)
 Roberts County (east)
 Carson County (south)
 Moore County (west)
 Potter County (southwest)
 Gray County (southeast)
 Sherman County (northwest)
 Ochiltree County (northeast)

National protected area
 Lake Meredith National Recreation Area (part)

Demographics

Note: the US Census treats Hispanic/Latino as an ethnic category. This table excludes Latinos from the racial categories and assigns them to a separate category. Hispanics/Latinos can be of any race.

As of the census of 2000,  23,857 people, 9,283 households, and 6,869 families resided in the county.  The population density was 27 people per square mile (10/km2).  The 10,871 housing units averaged 12 per square mile (5/km2).  The racial makeup of the county was 87.00% White, 2.41% Black or African American, 1.35% Native American, 0.35% Asian, 0.02% Pacific Islander, 6.66% from other races, and 2.21% from two or more races.  About 14.70% of the population was Hispanic or Latino of any race.

Of the 9,283 households, 34.80% had children under the age of 18 living with them, 61.40% were married couples living together, 9.10% had a female householder with no husband present, and 26.00% were not families. About 23.90% of all households were made up of individuals, and 11.90% had someone living alone who was 65 years of age or older.  The average household size was 2.54 and the average family size was 3.00.

In the county, the population was distributed as 27.40% under the age of 18, 8.70% from 18 to 24, 25.50% from 25 to 44, 22.70% from 45 to 64, and 15.60% who were 65 years of age or older.  The median age was 38 years. For every 100 females, there were 97.00 males.  For every 100 females age 18 and over, there were 93.60 males.

The median income for a household in the county was $36,588, and for a family was $42,500. Males had a median income of $40,029 versus $19,952 for females. The per capita income for the county was $17,317.  About 8.80% of families and 11.10% of the population were below the poverty line, including 14.70% of those under age 18 and 7.30% of those age 65 or over.

Communities

Cities
 Borger
 Fritch (small part in Moore County)
 Stinnett

Town
 Sanford

Census-designated place
 Lake Meredith Estates

Unincorporated community
 Pringle

Ghost towns
 Adobe Walls
 Phillips
 Plemons
 Whittenburg

Notable residents
 Donny Anderson, Green Bay Packers football player
 Mary Castle, actress
 Billy Dixon, Indian scout, Medal of Honor winner, and sheriff of Hutchinson County
 G. William Miller, former United States Secretary of the Treasury and chairman of the Federal Reserve Board
 Ron White, comedian, most noted for his work with the Blue Collar Comedy Tour

Politics

See also

 List of museums in the Texas Panhandle
 National Register of Historic Places listings in Hutchinson County, Texas
 Recorded Texas Historic Landmarks in Hutchinson County

References

External links
 https://web.archive.org/web/20191226135354/https://www.co.hutchinson.tx.us/
 History of Hutchinson County, Texas: 104 years, 1876–1980, hosted by the Portal to Texas History
 20th Century Burials in Hutchinson County, Texas from 1901–1999, hosted by the Portal to Texas History
 
 Hutchinson County Profile from the Texas Association of Counties

 
1901 establishments in Texas
Populated places established in 1901
Texas Panhandle